Deadly Chase is a 1978 Italian film directed by Franco Prosperi.

Plot 
Inspector Verrazzano is joined by the owner of an art gallery, Giulia Medici, who must investigate the death of her brother, whose case was filed a few months earlier as a suicide.

Cast 

Luc Merenda: Inspector Verrazzano
Janet Agren: Giulia Medici
Luciana Paluzzi: Rosy
María Baxa: Kora Verelli
Patrizia Gori: Giorgia 
Daniele Dublino: Inspector Biagi
Giacomo Rizzo: Brigadeer Baldelli
Gloria Piedimonte: Giorgia
Isarco Ravaioli: Alberto Volci aka The Baron 
Chris Avram: Marco Verelli
Attilio Dottesio: Notary Bruni

Style
Despite the films aggressive title, Deadly Chase was described by Italian film historian Roberto Curti as a film that "moves away from out-and-out poliziotteschi and its worn out schems and moves closer to the melancholic, contemplative vein of film noir".

Production
Deadly Chase was the second of two films directed by Franco Prosperi for producer Pino Buricchi in 1978. The film was shot at Incir de Paolis in Rome and in Nice.

Release
Deadly Chase was distributed theatrically in Italy by Nucleo Star on 8 December 1978. The film grossed a total of 443,627,250 Italian lira. Italian film historian described this gross as poor, stating that the film was "evidence of Merenda's quick commercial decline as well as that of the genre itself"

See also 
 List of Italian films of 1978

References

References

External links

Italian crime drama films
1970s Italian-language films
1970s Italian films